Alkalibacterium indicireducens is a Gram-positive, obligately alkaliphilic, facultatively anaerobic and rod-shaped bacterium from the genus Alkalibacterium.

References

Lactobacillales
Bacteria described in 2008